The Fulton Log House in Upper St. Clair Township, Allegheny County, Pennsylvania, was built circa 1830.  The log house was listed on the National Register of Historic Places on December 6, 1975.

Alexander Gilfillan settled in Upper St. Clair Township in the late 1760s and eventually owned 413 acres. About 1830, he or his son, John, built houses for his workers including four or five log houses, with only one surviving to the present. This house remained in the Gilfillan Family until 1899. James E. and Emily Fulton bought the house in 1923 as a summer home.  Their son James Grove Fulton was a lifelong bachelor and served in the U.S. Congress from 1945 to 1971.  His estate sold the house to Upper St. Clair Township in 1972.

The 1830 Log House Association restored the house and now uses it for educational purposes.

References

Houses completed in 1839
Houses in Allegheny County, Pennsylvania
Houses on the National Register of Historic Places in Pennsylvania
1839 establishments in Pennsylvania
National Register of Historic Places in Allegheny County, Pennsylvania
Log buildings and structures on the National Register of Historic Places in Pennsylvania